Edwards Point is a rocky point in the south extremity of Kermen Peninsula and Robert Island in the South Shetland Islands, Antarctica.  The point is a southeast entrance point of English Strait and forms the west side of the entrance to Devesil Bight and the southeast side of the entrance to Micalvi Cove.  The area was visited by early 19th century sealers.

The feature is named after Victor Edwards, a draughtsman in the British Admiralty Hydrographic Office during the 1930s.

Location

See also
 Robert Island
 South Shetland Islands

Maps
 L.L. Ivanov et al. Antarctica: Livingston Island and Greenwich Island, South Shetland Islands. Scale 1:100000 topographic map. Sofia: Antarctic Place-names Commission of Bulgaria, 2005.
 L.L. Ivanov. Antarctica: Livingston Island and Greenwich, Robert, Snow and Smith Islands. Scale 1:120000 topographic map.  Troyan: Manfred Wörner Foundation, 2009.

References
 SCAR Composite Antarctic Gazetteer.

Headlands of Robert Island